Cox Point is a rock headland at the southwest side of the terminus of Garfield Glacier where the latter discharges into Hull Bay, on the coast of Marie Byrd Land. The point was first observed and photographed from aircraft of the United States Antarctic Service, 1939–41, led by Admiral Richard E. Byrd. It was named by the Advisory Committee on Antarctic Names for E.F. Cox, a carpenter of the Byrd Antarctic Expedition, 1933–35.

References
 

Headlands of Marie Byrd Land